Ciprian Străuț (born 25 December 1982) is a Romanian former professional footballer who played as a midfielder.

References

External links
 

1982 births
Living people
Sportspeople from Timișoara
Romanian footballers
Association football midfielders
Liga I players
Liga II players
FC CFR Timișoara players
FC Bihor Oradea players
Salthill Devon F.C. players
ACS Sticla Arieșul Turda players
CSU Voința Sibiu players
CS Național Sebiș players
Romanian expatriate footballers
Expatriate association footballers in Ireland
Romanian expatriate sportspeople in Ireland